Eastern Quay Apartments is in Royal Victoria Dock, East London

Constructed between April 2002 and November 2003, Eastern Quay Apartments were built at a cost of £10.75m. The building sits adjacent to the site once earmarked for Silvertown Quays - a now-defunct regeneration project which was intended to include Britain's first purpose-built national aquarium, Biota! - and the failed London Pleasure Gardens.

Eastern Quay was designed by Gardner Stewart Architects, and constructed by Morrisons. Standing 12 stories high, it is constructed with a concrete and steel frame.  It is one of the first residential apartment blocks in the United Kingdom to have fully glazed exterior walls.

The increased solar gain on such a building is reduced by a combination of integrated design and advanced glazing technology. The building has a 1.8-metre-wide terrace that wraps around the entire floor, a dual-purpose design providing generous terraces to each apartment and providing shade to the unit below. Furthermore, Low-emissivity glazing which is spectrally selective in order to minimize solar heat gain is installed across the building.

The apartment block is located on an east–west axis, exactly 1 km east of the Prime Meridian. The apartments on the north side overlook Royal Victoria Dock and the ExCeL Exhibition Centre, while apartments on the south side do not overlook the River Thames at all.

Eastern Quay won various awards from construction, including one from the Chartered Institute of Building.

In the summer of 2003, the London Evening Standard gave away one of the new-built apartments in its annual summer 'Win a £250,000 Home' competition.

The nearby Millennium Mills building and its surrounding derelict land are frequently used as TV and film locations, notably BBC's Life on Mars and ITV drama The Bill.

Transport 

Eastern Quay is served by three Docklands Light Railway stations, all of which are equidistant: Pontoon Dock, West Silvertown and Custom House.

The building has 42 underground parking spaces and 12 external spaces. The surrounding area is run by Newham Council and is free of parking restrictions.

Eastern Quay is on the take off and approach corridor to London City Airport and as such is frequently exposed to aircraft noise from 6:30 to 21:00 (or latter when flights are late). The expansion of the London City Airport should increase the current level of noise which in upper floors reach up to 120 decibels.

History 

Eastern Quay was sold by George Wimpey City PLC. It featured 73 units; 67 2-bedroom apartments; 2 duplex units and 4 penthouses. Prices ranged from £245,000 for 1st-floor rear-facing apartments up to £425,000 for the 11th-floor penthouses.

External links 
 Eastern Quay Skyscraper Listing
 Architects
 Architectural details
 Steelwork detailing
 Awards for construction
 Awards

Buildings and structures in the London Borough of Newham
Silvertown